"Big Yellow Taxi" is a song written, composed, and originally recorded by Canadian singer-songwriter Joni Mitchell in 1970, and originally released on her album Ladies of the Canyon. It was a hit in her native Canada (No. 14) as well as Australia (No. 6) and the UK (No. 11). It only reached No. 67 in the US in 1970, but was later a bigger hit there for her in a live version released in 1974, which peaked at No. 24. Charting versions have also been recorded by The Neighborhood (who had the original top US 40 hit with the track in 1970, peaking at No. 29), and most notably covered by Amy Grant in 1994 and Counting Crows in 2003. The song was also sampled in Janet Jackson's "Got 'til It's Gone" (1997).

Mitchell's composition and recording

In 1996, speaking to journalist Robert Hilburn, Mitchell said this about writing the song:

The song is known for its environmental concern – "They paved paradise to put up a parking lot" and "Hey farmer, farmer, put away that DDT now" – and sentimental sound. The line "They took all the trees, and put 'em in a tree museum / And charged the people a dollar and a half just to see 'em" refers to Foster Botanical Garden in downtown Honolulu, which is a living museum of tropical plants, some rare and endangered.

In the song's final verse, the political gives way to the personal. Mitchell recounts the departure of her "old man" in the eponymous "big yellow taxi", which may refer to the old Metro Toronto Police patrol cars, which until 1986 were painted yellow. In many covers the departed one may be interpreted as variously a boyfriend, a husband or a father. The literal interpretation is that he is walking out on the singer by taking a taxi; otherwise it is assumed he is being taken away by the authorities.

Mitchell's original recording was first released as a single and then, as stated above, included on her 1970 album Ladies of the Canyon. A later live version was released in 1974 (1975 in France and Spain) on Miles of Aisles and reached No. 24 on the U.S. charts. Billboard regarded the live version as "more full of life" than any of the singles Mitchell released in a long time.  Cash Box called the live version "a great rendition of this excellent lyrical song."

In 1995, to coincide with the song's inclusion in the American sitcom Friends, the song was rereleased as a maxi-single with new remixes in a variety of styles.

The song still receives significant airplay in Canada; in 2005, it was voted No. 9 on CBC's list of the top 50 essential Canadian tracks.

In 2007, Joni Mitchell released the album Shine, which includes a newly recorded, rearranged version of the song.

Music video
An animated music video of Joni Mitchell's "Big Yellow Taxi" was produced by John Wilson of Fine Arts Films as an animated short for the Sonny and Cher television show in the mid-1970s. The only commercial release of this full-length music video was in the Video Gems home video release on VHS titled John Wilson's Mini Musicals, also released as The Fantastic All-Electric Music Movie. The home video also contains an animated music video of Mitchell's song "Both Sides, Now".

Track listing
1995 maxi-single
 "Big Yellow Taxi" 
 "Big Yellow Taxi" 
 "Big Yellow Taxi" 
 "Big Yellow Taxi" 
 "Big Yellow Taxi" 
 "Big Yellow Taxi" 
 "Big Yellow Taxi"

Charts

Certifications

Amy Grant version

In 1995, American singer Amy Grant released a cover of "Big Yellow Taxi" to pop and adult contemporary radio in the United States and United Kingdom. The song was the fourth (third in the US) pop radio single from her 1994 album, House of Love. Grant's version featured slightly altered lyrics, which she changed at Joni Mitchell's request.

The cover peaked at No. 67 on the US Billboard Hot 100, No. 25 in Canada, No. 20 on the UK Singles Chart, and No. 4 in Iceland. Grant also released a music video for the single, which was aired in the US and UK and released to home video on Grant's Greatest Videos 1986-2004 DVD. Grant also performed the song for her 2006 concert album, Time Again... Amy Grant Live.

Track listings
US CD single
 "Big Yellow Taxi" 
 "Big Yellow Taxi" 
 "Big Yellow Taxi" 

UK CD single
 "Big Yellow Taxi" 
 "House of Love" 
 "Every Heartbeat" 
 "Lucky One"

Charts

Weekly charts

Year-end charts

Counting Crows and Vanessa Carlton version

In 2002, Counting Crows covered the song with backing vocals by Vanessa Carlton. It was included on the soundtrack to the film Two Weeks Notice. Originally, the song was a hidden track on the band's 2002 album Hard Candy, and it did not include Carlton until it was to be featured in the film. New releases of the album included it as a track with her added, as with her in the video (which was shot on Coney Island, Brooklyn, and in nearby Bensonhurst), although Counting Crows and Carlton neither appeared in the video together nor recorded together. This version slightly changed Mitchell's original lyrics to describe when the eponymous taxi "took my girl away", instead of Mitchell's "took away my old man". The original version of the song without Vanessa was included on the album Nolee Mix, which was released to promote the My Scene dolls.

This cover reached No. 42 on the US Billboard Hot 100 and entered the top five on three other Billboard listings. The song became the band's only top-20 single in the United Kingdom, peaking at No. 13, and it reached the top 10 in Australia, Ireland, and New Zealand. The single was certified gold by the Recording Industry Association of America (RIAA) and platinum by the Australian Recording Industry Association (ARIA).

Music video
The music video features the Counting Crows performing on a boardwalk in Coney Island, New York.  Vanessa Carlton also walks around the streets and sings along to the song.  Several people are shown looking back at mirages of past relationships or friendships that they regret losing.  Meanwhile, a yellow taxi drives through the streets, calling the attention of the Crows, Carlton, and the former couples.  The taxis are transporting mirage of themselves or their former significant other, with some trying to chase after it.  The "big yellow taxi [that] took my old man/girl away".  One former couple does in fact again meet face to face.

Critical reception
The Village Voice named this cover the worst song of the 2000s, and the Village Voice's scathing review of the cover is archived on Joni Mitchell's website. The review derided the cover as having paved paradise (Mitchell's original song) and put up a parking lot.  Additionally, NME also included this cover on its list of the worst songs of the 2000s, and Ultimate Classic Rock highlighted this song in its Terrible Classic Rock Covers series. In April 2022, American Songwriter ranked "Big Yellow Taxi" at number 10 on their list of "The Top 10 Counting Crows Songs".

Track listing

Charts

Weekly charts

Year-end charts

Certifications

Release history

Other notable cover versions
Many other artists have covered the song.
A single version by the singing group the Neighborhood reached the Billboard Top 40 chart (No. 29) in the summer of 1970. It also peaked at number 19 in Australia.
A cover of the song was featured on the 1973 album Dylan by Bob Dylan. It received unfavorable critical reception.
 The punk band Pinhead Gunpowder covered the song on their 1994 album Jump Salty.
 In 1996, "Big Yellow Taxi (Traffic Jam Mix)" peaked on the U.S. dance charts at No. 39 and was part of the soundtrack album to Friends: Music from the TV Series.
 This song is sampled by Labrinth in the song "Sundown," from his debut 2012 album Electronic Earth.

References

External links
Lyrics for original version at jonimitchell.com
Lyrics for 2007 version at jonimitchell.com
[ Traffic Jam Mix / Friends Soundtrack] at AllMusic
[ Traffic Jam Mix Chart Position] at Billboard Hot Dance Club Play

1970 debut singles
1970 songs
2002 singles
A&M Records singles
APRA Award winners
Bob Dylan songs
Counting Crows songs
Environmental songs
Geffen Records singles
Joni Mitchell songs
RCA Records singles
Reprise Records singles
Song recordings produced by Joni Mitchell
Song recordings produced by Steve Lillywhite
Songs written by Joni Mitchell
Sony BMG singles
Vanessa Carlton songs